The purple honeycreeper (Cyanerpes caeruleus) is a small Neotropical bird in the tanager family Thraupidae. It is found in the tropical New World from Colombia and Venezuela south to Brazil, and on Trinidad. A few, possibly introduced birds have been recorded on Tobago.

Taxonomy
The purple honeycreeper was formally described by the Swedish naturalist Carl Linnaeus in 1758 in the tenth edition of his Systema Naturae under the binomial name Certhia carrulea. Linnaeus based his description on "The Blue Creeper" that had been described and illustrated in 1743 by the English naturalist George Edwards from specimens collected in Suriname. The specimens had been mounted in glass cases and were owned by the Duke of Richmond. The purple honeycreeper is now placed in the genus Cyanerpes that was introduced in 1899 by the American ornithologist Harry C. Oberholser. The specific epithet caeruleus is Latin for "dark blue".

Five subspecies are recognised:
 C. c. chocoanus Hellmayr, 1920 – east Panama to west Ecuador
 C. c. caeruleus (Linnaeus, 1758) – central Colombia and Venezuela through the Guianas and north-central Brazil
 C. c. hellmayri Gyldenstolpe, 1945 – Potaro Highlands (Guyana)
 C. c. longirostris (Cabanis, 1851) – Trinidad
 C. c. microrhynchus (Berlepsch, 1884) – west, central Amazonia

Description
The purple honeycreeper is 4.5 in (11.5 cm) long, weighs 0.42 oz (12 g) and has a long black decurved bill. The male is purple with black wings, tail and belly, and bright yellow legs. Females and immatures have green upperparts, and green-streaked yellowish-buff underparts. The throat is cinnamon, and there is a blue moustachial stripe. The call of purple honeycreeper is a thin high-pitched zree. The Trinidadian subspecies  C. c. longirostris has a longer bill than the mainland forms.

Distribution and habitat
The species is a bird of northern South America, and besides the Amazon Basin and the Guianas, a coastal range occurs west of the Andes, including parts of southern Panama. In the south, its range extends to the extreme western Pantanal. Though it is most frequently seen in the lowlands up to 3,300 ft (1,000 m) ASL or so, it has been encountered as high as 7,500 ft (2,300 m) ASL.

This is a forest canopy species, but also occurs in cocoa and citrus plantations. At the upper limit of its altitudinal range, it frequents premontane rainforest, usually rather low-growing (33–50 ft/10–15 m) and full of epiphytes and mosses, and even elfin forest and páramo.

Behaviour and ecology
The purple honeycreeper is often found in small groups. It feeds on nectar (particularly from bromeliad and similar flowers, to which its bill shape is adapted), berries and seeds (i.e., Trema and Clusia), fruit (i.e., bananas and papayas) and insects, mainly in the canopy. It is a bold and inquisitive bird, responding readily to the call of the ferruginous pygmy owl (Glaucidium brasilianum) by coming out of cover and searching for the presumed predator to mob it. The female purple honeycreeper builds a small cup nest in a tree, and incubates the clutch of two brown-blotched white eggs.

Gallery

References

Further reading
 ffrench, Richard; O'Neill, John Patton & Eckelberry, Don R. (1991): A guide to the birds of Trinidad and Tobago (2nd edition). Comstock Publishing, Ithaca, N.Y.. 
 Hilty, Steven L. (2003): Birds of Venezuela. Christopher Helm, London.

External links

Purple Honeycreeper videos on the Internet Bird Collection
Purple Honeycreeper photo gallery VIREO
Photo-High Res—Green female-(Close-up); Article stevenrotsch Photo--(male)

purple honeycreeper
Birds of the Amazon Basin
Birds of Colombia
Birds of Venezuela
Birds of Ecuador
Birds of the Guianas
Birds of Trinidad and Tobago
Páramo fauna
purple honeycreeper
purple honeycreeper
Birds of Brazil